Iwona Niedźwiedź (born 22 July 1979) is a Polish former handball player. She lastly played for the club SPR Lublin SSA, and she played for the Polish national team and represented Poland at the 2013 World Women's Handball Championship in Serbia.

Niedźwiedź also played for Poland women's national beach handball team and participated at the 2019 European Beach Handball Championships in Stare Jabłonki.

After her career ended, she began working with Kanał Sportowy as a journalist.

References

External links
Player profile at the Polish Handball Association website 

Polish female handball players
1979 births
Living people
Sportspeople from Nowy Sącz
Beach handball players